The Countess Kathleen and Various Legends and Lyrics (1892) is the second poetry collection of W. B. Yeats.

It includes the play The Countess Kathleen and group of shorter lyrics that Yeats would later collect under the title of The Rose in his Collected Poems.

This volume includes several of Yeats' most popular poems, including "The Lake Isle of Innisfree", "A Faery Song", "When You are Old", and "Who Goes with Fergus". (The last is sung by Stephen Dedalus to his mother as she lies dying in  James Joyce's Ulysses.)

Many of these poems also reflect Yeats' new-discovered interest in alchemy and esotericism.

Contents
Preface
The Countess Kathleen
To the Rose upon the Rood of Time
Fergus and the Druid
The Rose of the World
The Peace of the Rose
The Death of Cuchullin
The White Birds
Father Gilligan
Father O'Hart
When You Are Old
The Sorrow of Love
The Ballad of the Old Foxhunter
A Fairy Song
The Pity of Love
"The Lake Isle of Innisfree" (text)
A Cradle Song
The Man who Dreamed of Fairy Land
Dedication of Irish Tales
The Lamentation of the Old Pensioner
When You are Sad
The Two Trees
They Went Forth to the Battle, But They Always Fell
An Epitaph
Apologia Addressed to Ireland in the Coming Days
Notes

See also
 1892 in poetry
 List of works by William Butler Yeats

External links
 The Countess Kathleen and Various Legends and Lyrics (archive.org)

1892 books
Irish poetry collections
Poetry by W. B. Yeats